Limpinwood may refer to:

Limpinwood, New South Wales
Limpinwood Nature Reserve